Ali Hojjat Kashani (1921 – 11 April 1979) was a lieutenant general in the Imperial Army of Iran and the deputy prime minister. He was head of the Physical Education Organization. He was executed in Qasr Prison after the Iranian Revolution in 1979. During his tenure Iranian sportspeople won 64 medals at the Asian Games in Tehran, including 30 gold medal. He also played an important role in the re-admission of Chinese sports to international forums.

He was known as the "Timsar Hojjat" among the people of the sports community.

References

External links

Imperial Iranian Army lieutenant generals
20th-century Iranian politicians
1921 births
1979 deaths
Military personnel executed during the Iranian Revolution